Duo (Wesleyan) 1994 is a live album by composer and saxophonist Anthony Braxton with percussionist Abraham Adzinyah recorded at Wesleyan University in 1994 and released on the Leo label.

Reception

The Allmusic review by Chris Kelsey stated "Braxton is never better than when he allows himself the most freedom. Here, though he is reined in a bit by the regular beat of Adzinyah's Middle-Eastern drumming, the saxophonist is relatively unencumbered by formal concerns; this is the best possible framework in which to hear Braxton's improvising. ... In contexts like this, Braxton is the most focused and intense of improvisors. It's evident, when listening to him play what is essentially "free" music, how little he really needs in the way of external organization. ... This set is a prime example of how transcendent an artist he can be, when left to his own devices".

Track listing
All compositions by Anthony Braxton and Abraham Adzinyah.

Disc one
 "Untitled" – 51:12
Disc two
 "Untitled" – 49:48

Personnel
 Anthony Braxton – reeds
Abraham Adzinyah – percussion

References

Anthony Braxton live albums
1994 live albums
Leo Records live albums